3 Juno is a large asteroid in the asteroid belt. Juno was the third asteroid discovered, in 1804, by German astronomer Karl Harding. It is one of the twenty largest asteroids and one of the two largest stony (S-type) asteroids, along with 15 Eunomia. It is estimated to contain 1% of the total mass of the asteroid belt.

History

Discovery 

Juno was discovered on 1 September 1804, by Karl Ludwig Harding. It was the third asteroid found, but was initially considered to be a planet; it was reclassified as an asteroid and minor planet during the 1850s.

Name and symbol 

Juno is named after the mythological Juno, the highest Roman goddess. The adjectival form is Junonian (from Latin jūnōnius), with the historical final n of the name (still seen in the French form, Junon) reappearing, analogous to Pluto ~ Plutonian.
'Juno' is the international name for the asteroid, subject to local variation: Italian Giunone, French Junon, Russian Юнона (Yunona), etc. 

The old astronomical symbol of Juno, still used in astrology, is a scepter topped by a star, ⚵.
The generic asteroid symbol of a disk with its discovery number, was introduced in 1852 and quickly became the norm. The scepter symbol was resurrected for astrological use in 1973.

Characteristics
Juno is one of the larger asteroids, perhaps tenth by size and containing approximately 1% the mass of the entire asteroid belt. It is the second-most-massive S-type asteroid after 15 Eunomia. Even so, Juno has only 3% the mass of Ceres.

The orbital period of Juno is 4.36578 years.

Amongst S-type asteroids, Juno is unusually reflective, which may be indicative of distinct surface properties. This high albedo explains its relatively high apparent magnitude for a small object not near the inner edge of the asteroid belt. Juno can reach +7.5 at a favourable opposition, which is brighter than Neptune or Titan, and is the reason for it being discovered before the larger asteroids Hygiea, Europa, Davida, and Interamnia. At most oppositions, however, Juno only reaches a magnitude of around +8.7—only just visible with binoculars—and at smaller elongations a  telescope will be required to resolve it. It is the main body in the Juno family.

Juno was originally considered a planet, along with 1 Ceres, 2 Pallas, and 4 Vesta. In 1811, Schröter estimated Juno to be as large as 2290 km in diameter. All four were reclassified as asteroids as additional asteroids were discovered. Juno's small size and irregular shape preclude it from being designated a dwarf planet.

Juno orbits at a slightly closer mean distance to the Sun than Ceres or Pallas. Its orbit is moderately inclined at around 12° to the ecliptic, but has an extreme eccentricity, greater than that of Pluto. This high eccentricity brings Juno closer to the Sun at perihelion than Vesta and further out at aphelion than Ceres. Juno had the most eccentric orbit of any known body until 33 Polyhymnia was discovered in 1854, and of asteroids over 200 km in diameter only 324 Bamberga has a more eccentric orbit.

Juno rotates in a prograde direction with an axial tilt of approximately 50°. The maximum temperature on the surface, directly facing the Sun, was measured at about 293 K on 2 October 2001. Taking into account the heliocentric distance at the time, this gives an estimated maximum temperature of 301 K (+28 °C) at perihelion.

Spectroscopic studies of the Junonian surface permit the conclusion that Juno could be the progenitor of chondrites, a common type of stony meteorite composed of iron-bearing silicates such as olivine and pyroxene. Infrared images reveal that Juno possesses an approximately 100 km-wide crater or ejecta feature, the result of a geologically young impact.

Based on MIDAS infrared data using the Hale telescope, an average radius of 135.7±11 was reported in 2004.

Observations 

Juno was the first asteroid for which an occultation was observed. It passed in front of a dim star (SAO 112328) on 19 February 1958. Since then, several occultations by Juno have been observed, the most fruitful being the occultation of SAO 115946 on 11 December 1979, which was registered by 18 observers.
Juno occulted the magnitude 11.3 star PPMX 9823370 on 29 July 2013, and 2UCAC 30446947 on 30 July 2013.

Radio signals from spacecraft in orbit around Mars and on its surface have been used to estimate the mass of Juno from the tiny perturbations induced by it onto the motion of Mars. Juno's orbit appears to have changed slightly around 1839, very likely due to perturbations from a passing asteroid, whose identity has not been determined.

In 1996, Juno was imaged by the Hooker Telescope at Mount Wilson Observatory at visible and near-IR wavelengths, using adaptive optics. The images spanned a whole rotation period and revealed an irregular shape and a dark albedo feature, interpreted as a fresh impact site.

Oppositions 
Juno reaches opposition from the Sun every 15.5 months or so, with its minimum distance varying greatly depending on whether it is near perihelion or aphelion. Sequences of favorable oppositions occur every 10th opposition, i.e. just over every 13 years. The last favorable oppositions were on 1 December 2005, at a distance of 1.063 AU, magnitude 7.55, and on 17 November 2018, at a minimum distance of 1.036 AU, magnitude 7.45. The next favorable opposition will be 30 October 2031, at a distance of 1.044 AU, magnitude 7.42.

See also 
 Former classification of planets

Notes

References

External links 

 JPL Ephemeris
 Well resolved images from four angles taken at Mount Wilson observatory
 Shape model deduced from light curve
 Asteroid Juno Grabs the Spotlight
  (displays Elong from Sun and V mag for 2011)
 
 

Juno asteroids
Juno
Juno
Articles containing video clips
S-type asteroids (Tholen)
Sk-type asteroids (SMASS)
18040901
Objects observed by stellar occultation